Chaenopsis stephensi is a species of chaenopsid blenny found in coral reefs around Venezuela and Yucatan, Mexico, in the western central Atlantic ocean. The specific name honours the  environmental biologist John S. Stephens, Jr.

References
 Robins, C. R. and J. E. Randall 1965 (28 Oct.) Three new western Atlantic fishes of the blennioid genus Chaenopsis, with notes on the related Lucayablennius zingaro. Proceedings of the Academy of Natural Sciences of Philadelphia v. 117 (no. 6): 213–234.

stephensi
Fish described in 1965